David Huestis may refer to:

 David B. Huestis, member of the board of the World Scout Foundation
 David L. Huestis, American physicist